Lisa Wilkinson  (born 19 December 1959) is an Australian television presenter and journalist.

Wilkinson currently narrates Ambulance Australia and has previously co-hosted the Nine Network's breakfast television program, Today, with Karl Stefanovic (2007–2017), Weekend Sunrise on the Seven Network (2005–2007), and The Project on Network Ten (2018–2022).

Career

Magazines

Dolly
Wilkinson was born in Wollongong, but grew up in Campbelltown, in Sydney's Western Suburbs and attended Campbelltown High School (now Campbelltown Performing Arts High School). She began her career working for the magazine Dolly. At age 21, she was offered the job as its editor. During her time there she became known for discovering young female talent, including a then-unknown Nicole Kidman.

Cleo
After tripling the magazine's circulation, she was personally approached by Kerry Packer to become editor of Australian Consolidated Press women's lifestyle magazine, Cleo. One of her first acts was to remove the magazine's infamous male centrefold. During her time as editor, she mentored up and coming journalists such as Mia Freedman and Deborah Thomas.
Over ten years Wilkinson became the title's longest-serving editor, and during her tenure there was unprecedented circulation growth for the magazine. Wilkinson went on to become Cleo's International Editor-in-Chief as it opened title in New Zealand and Asia.

Australian Women's Weekly
From 1999 to 2007, Wilkinson was  Editor-At-Large of The Australian Women's Weekly.

Huffington Post
In August 2015 Wilkinson was asked by Arianna Huffington to become the Australian Editor-at-large of The Huffington Post. A role she held until 2018.

Television
Her television career began in the late 1990s when she became a regular panelist on Network Ten and Foxtel's Beauty and the Beast. During the 2000 Summer Olympics, she (along with Duncan Armstrong) co-hosted The Morning Shift on the Seven Network.

Weekend Sunrise
In April 2005, Wilkinson began hosting Weekend Sunrise on the Seven Network with Chris Reason, later with Andrew O'Keefe.

Today
On 10 May 2007, it was confirmed that Wilkinson was to co-host Today on the Nine Network after Jessica Rowe left the network and she began appearing on Today on 28 May 2007. This was Stefanovic's fifth female co-host in just over two years. In 2016, the duo took the show to number one in the breakfast TV wars for the first time in 12 years.
On 16 October 2017, Wilkinson resigned from the Nine Network and Today due to a contract dispute with nine management over the significant gender pay gap that existed between her and long-time cohost Karl Stefanovic. after ten years with the network, effective immediately. 
Wilkinson herself announced she was leaving on Twitter and then just over an hour later announced on Twitter that she was joining Channel Ten.

In her 2021 memoir, It Wasn't Meant to Be Like This, Wilkinson revealed that she had been sacked over her request for a fairer pay structure at the Network.

The Project
In 2018, she joined The Project, a nightly TV current affairs programme on Network 10.  On November 20, 2022 Wilkinson "stepped down from her role on The Project after a controversial year on the program."

Carols by Candlelight
From 2008 to 2016, Wilkinson was the co-host of the Nine Network's Carols by Candlelight, replacing long time host Ray Martin when Martin semi-retired. Wilkinson's co-host from 2008 until 2012 was Karl Stefanovic, and in 2013 she was joined by David Campbell. She was replaced by Sonia Kruger in 2017 after she left the Nine Network.

Other
In 2013, Wilkinson gave the Andrew Olle Memorial Lecture on the treatment of women in and by the media. She was the first female journalist to give the speech since Jana Wendt in 1997.

In 2017, Wilkinson was remarked on by The Daily Mail for wearing on air a blouse she had worn four months before. Her cohost, Karl Stefanovic, had previously worn the same suit every day for a year without attracting notice. Wilkinson posted a tweet criticizing the sexism and wore the blouse on air the next day, sardonically writing "my greatest legacy to the annals of female news broadcasting history will likely be that I dared to wear the same outfit two days in a row on national TV". Other male and female Today Show hosts also wore the blouse on air in following days.

In October 2021, Wilkinson was named a two-time finalist in the Walkley Awards for her ground-breaking interview with political staffer Brittany Higgins in which she alleged being raped on Federal Government Minister Linda Reynold's office couch in 2019.  That story led to a full cultural review by Federal Sex Discrimination Commissioner, Kate Jenkins, into the workplace treatment of women in Parliament House.

Personal life
Wilkinson married author, journalist and former rugby international Peter FitzSimons on 26 September 1992; they have two sons and one daughter.

She published her autobiography in 2021: It Wasn't Meant to Be Like This, HarperCollins, 496 pages.

Honours
Wilkinson was appointed a Member of the Order of Australia in the 2016 Australia Day Honours list for significant service to the print and broadcast media as a journalist and presenter, and to a range of youth and women's health groups.

In 2017, Wilkinson's portrait by artist Peter Smeeth was a finalist in the Archibald Prize, and winner of the Packing Room Prize.

In 2022, Wilkinson was part of The Project team that won 2 Logie Awards - one for Most Popular Panel or Current Affairs Program and one for Most Outstanding News Coverage or Public Affairs Report.

Controversy
On receiving an award at the nationally televised 62nd Annual Logie Awards, Wilkinson "gave a speech in which she openly referred to and praised" the complainant in a sexual assault matter, despite "clear and appropriate" warning of the associated risks of doing so while criminal court proceedings were afoot.

The subsequent publicity generated from Wilkinson's speech caused lawyers for the man awaiting trial in this matter to lodge an application to temporarily stay proceedings. On 21 June 2022, lawyers for the accused argued that Wilkinson's "speech did not need to be made" and The Honourable Chief Justice Lucy McCallum granted the man’s application.

Commenting on Wilkinson's speech, Chief Justice McCallum said, “What concerns me most about this recent round is that the distinction between an allegation and a finding of guilt has been completely obliterated”. Her Honour further stated that, “The implicit premise of [Wilkinson’s speech was] to celebrate the truthfulness of the story she exposed” before any finding of guilt, and in the context of the accused denying that “any sexual activity took place”. The Australian Broadcasting Corporation reported that "the prosecution is considering making an application for a restraint on commentary by Ms Wilkinson".

In 2023, Bruce Lehrmann launched a defamation suit against Wilkinson, Samantha Maiden, Network 10, and News Corp. Wilkinson and others made comments about Lehrmann ahead of his trial where he was accused of raping Brittany Higgins but the trial was abandoned due to misconduct by one of the jurors.

References

External links 

 

Living people
People from Wollongong
Journalists from Sydney
Australian autobiographers
Australian television presenters
Australian women journalists
Members of the Order of Australia
Australian women television presenters
20th-century Australian journalists
20th-century Australian women
Australian republicans
1959 births